Universalis is a storytelling and role-playing game.

Universalis may also refer to:
Encyclopedia Universalis, a French-language encyclopedia
Europa Universalis (EU), a grand strategy video game
 or one of its sequels Europa Universalis II, Europa Universalis III, Europa Universalis: Rome, Europa Universalis IV
UCMSA Universalis, student society of University College Maastricht, Netherlands
Universalis is a free clone of the proprietary font Futura
Universalis, a 2018 album by Hammock